Peter A. Wuffli (born 26 October 1957) is a Swiss businessman who was appointed president and chief executive officer of UBS AG in December 2001 after serving as the chief executive of UBS Asset Management and the company's chief financial officer.

Education and personal life

He is a Swiss citizen and graduated from the University of St. Gallen in 1981 and earned a doctorate in 1984. He also attended the Advanced Management Program at Wharton School of the University of Pennsylvania and graduated in 1999. He and his wife Susanna have three children. 

His father Heinz R. Wuffli was general director of Credit Suisse from 1967 to 1977, when he resigned as a consequence of the Chiasso affair.

Career 
In 1984, he joined McKinsey & Co as management consultant and in 1990 became a partner of McKinsey Switzerland's senior management.

From 1994 to 1998, he was the chief financial officer at SBC and a member of SBC's group executive board in Basel. After the 1998 merger of SBC and UBS AG, Wufflii was appointed president of the Group Executive Board in 2001 and became CEO in 2003.

Wuffli left as a CEO UBS AG on 6 July 2007 and renounced about $10 million in payments.

Other engagements 
In December 2006, Wuffli and his wife founded The Elea Foundation for Ethics in Globalization.

He is chairman of the board of Partners Group Holding, a board member of the Zurich Opera House, member of the executive committee and chairman of the board of IMD International Institute for Management Development in Lausanne.

He was president of the Friends of the FDP (Freunde der FDP) association, founded 2004 to support the Swiss FDP political party.

Publications 
 Liberale Ethik. Orientierungsversuch im Zeitalter der Globalisierung. Stämpfli Verlag, Bern 2010, 
 Inclusive Leadership, A Framework for the Global Era. Springer 2016,

References

1957 births
Living people
Management consultants
McKinsey & Company people
Businesspeople from Zürich
Swiss businesspeople
University of St. Gallen alumni
Swiss chief executives
Chief financial officers